Taras Shevchenko was a Ukrainian writer, artist, and political figure.

Taras Shevchenko may also refer to:

 Taras Shevchenko (film), a 1951 Soviet film
 , a river cruise ship operated by Imperial Travel
 , a former cruise ship operated by the Soviet Union's Black Sea Shipping Company, scrapped in 2005
 Tarasa Shevchenka (Kyiv Metro), subway station
 Taras Shevchenko, a video tape released by New Order
 Taras Shevchenko Memorial, a 1964 monument in Washington D.C., United States